Helen Shivers is a fictional character in the I Know What You Did Last Summer franchise. She was created by American writer Lois Duncan and originates from Duncan's 1973 suspense novel I Know What You Did Last Summer as a young woman involved in a hit and run accident. In this version, she is known as Helen Rivers.

She was portrayed by actress Sarah Michelle Gellar in the Kevin Williamson scripted feature film I Know What You Did Last Summer (1997) as the Croaker Queen of the Southport 1996 Beauty Pageant. Her chase sequence with the killer of the film has been deemed iconic and has been described as toying with the audience's expectations.

While the film itself received mixed reviews, Gellar's performance was met with critical acclaim and the character has obtained a cult following in recent years. In 2018, she was portrayed by Greer Grammer in the musical parody I Know What You Did Last Summer: The Unauthorized Musical that premiered at the El Cid in Los Angeles.

The character is particularly notable for challenging horror film tropes of the time, in which the characters (in most cases teenage victims) were left underdeveloped and without a substantial story arc. Helen’s storyline has often been referred to as a highlight of the film.

Appearances

Literature
Helen originates from Lois Duncan's 1973 suspense novel I Know What You Did Last Summer. She is depicted as a high school drop out from a large family who manages to launch a successful television career as an actress. She was involved in a hit-and-run accident of a cycling boy with her boyfriend Barry Cox, and friends Julie James and Ray Bronson. A year later, Julie reveals a letter to Helen that says "I know what you did last summer". The next day, while tanning at her apartment complex she meets Collingsworth Wilson who moved into one of the vacant apartments the day before. She later finds a magazine cutout of a boy riding a bicycle taped to her apartment door. After a series of bizarre encounters with the anonymous figure toying with them, Helen is confronted by Collingsworth at her apartment. She locks herself inside her bathroom and escapes through her window as he tries to break the door down. Later, Helen calls the police and sends them to Julie's house, who was Collingsworth's next target.

Film
Shivers makes her cinematic debut in the 1997 film. On the Fourth of July, Helen wins the Fourth of July Croaker Beauty Pageant and reveals aspirations as a New York-based actress. Afterwards, she goes to the beach with her friends Julie James, Barry Cox, and Ray Bronson. While driving on the byway, they accidentally run over a pedestrian. They decide to dump the body into the sea and to never talk about what happened.

A year later, she is revealed to have failed as an actress and now works at her family's store. When Julie receives a letter with no return address, stating, "I know what you did last summer!" she tracks her down and the duo reunite with Barry and Ray. The rest of the group begin to receive taunting messages from the mysterious assailant. One morning, Helen wakes up to find her hair cut off and "Soon" written in lipstick on her mirror.

At the Croaker Beauty Pageant, Helen witnesses the murder of Barry on the balcony. With his body nowhere to be found, a police officer escorts a hysterical Helen home, but the killer murders him in an alleyway. Helen breaks out of the back of the police car and is chased to her family's store. The killer enters through the unlocked back door and murders her sister Elsa. Helen is chased to the third floor of the building and jumps out of the window. She manages to make it a few feet away from the parade, but the killer appears behind her and begins to slash her, her screams being obscured by the parade. Her corpse is later discovered by Julie.

Shivers makes a cameo appearance in I Still Know What You Did Last Summer (1998) in a photograph through use of Sarah Michelle Gellar's personality rights.

Development
 The character originates from American writer Lois Duncan's 1973 suspense novel I Know What You Did Last Summer as one of the main characters involved in a hit-and-run accident. In this version she is named Helen Rivers, her family is poorer and (possibly) larger than in the film, and she isn't murdered. Her aspirations as an actress are found with greater success in the novel than in the film adaptation. Gellar was the last of the lead actors to be cast. In the 1997 film, she has been described as a "local beauty-pageant winner who wants to become an actress". Shivers is initially depicted as a vapid, egotistical beauty queen, but over the course of the film she is shown to be a very affectionate person despite her dysfunctional home life and overt loneliness.

Alexandra West attests that the film constantly alludes to her physical attractiveness and superficial vanity, writing that "Helen is constantly framed in doorways and mirrors, lending to the notion that she is an object to be looked at and that her looks are her most indelible quality." However, she notes that this is a stark contrast to her profound personal struggles that are revealed later in the film:
 "Director Jim Gillespie makes it clear that Helen is completely and utterly alone with no true connections, so much that she appears almost relieved when the notes that says, "I know what you did last summer" begin appearing, as it gives her an excuse to reconnect with her friends. Her death is equal parts tense and tragic."

Popular culture
The character was spoofed in the form of Buffy Gilmore (a nod to Sarah Michelle Gellar's Buffy the Vampire Slayer), a character portrayed by Shannon Elizabeth in the Keenen Ivory Wayans directed parody film Scary Movie (2000) and by Julie Benz in Shriek If You Know What I Did Last Friday the 13th. Curiously, Gellar and Benz have previously worked together in Buffy the Vampire Slayer. 

In 2018, Greer Grammer was cast in the musical parody I Know What You Did Last Summer: The Unauthorized Musical that premiered at the El Cid in Los Angeles.

Reception
Gellar's performance in the film was met with acclaim. Her portrayal earned her a Blockbuster Entertainment Award for Favorite Supporting Actress – Horror and a MTV Movie Award nomination for Best Breakthrough Performance.

Years since the release of the 1997 film, Shivers has been frequently referred to as a breakout character. In an article for Rotten Tomatoes, April Wolfe states, "The key to Helen Shivers’ success as a sidekick is her unabashed and shameless vanity. Sarah Michelle Gellar's portrayal of the character paints her as the beauty queen with depth, the most likely to succeed. She's the woman with the plan to track down the killer and the guts to charge into the crowd of the Croaker Queen Pageant talent competition to save her friend. Unfortunately, luck just wasn't on her side."

Chris Eggertsen of Uproxx described the character as being complex. Eggertsen praised Gellar for giving a "compelling" performance and for being able to transform Helen from a vapid self absorbed beauty queen to a fully realized and sympathetic character. Similarly, writer Sara Century of Syfy Wire described her as a "compelling character" and is notably different from other horror film characters due to her intimate character arc, "Helen is a compelling character especially in horror, a genre that traditionally fails to give emotional backing to its doomed teenagers. On the surface, she's shallow, obsessed with beauty pageants and trips to New York. Yet there's something haunted in Helen from the very beginning, and it gives her character a lot more weight than what we see at face value. There have been full essays written on her death scene alone, and she has remained surprisingly influential." West states that her story line is the most visible out of the four central characters.

References

Works cited
 
 
 

Female characters in literature
Female horror fiction characters
Fictional actors
I Know What You Did Last Summer (franchise)
Literary characters introduced in 1973
Film characters introduced in 1997